Amulette Garneau (August 11, 1928 – November 7, 2008) was a Canadian actress living in Quebec.

She was born Huguette Laurendeau in Montreal and was educated at the École des beaux-arts de Montréal, going on to study acting at the school of the Théâtre du Nouveau Monde and dramatic art with Uta Hagen in New York City. Garneau also studied with Georges Groulx.

Garneau performed with various theatre companies, including the Montreal Repertory Theatre and the Théâtre de Quat'Sous. She also became one of Michel Tremblay's favourite performers; she appeared in a number of his productions for the stage as well as the film Once Upon a Time in the East. She appeared in a number of television series, including 14, rue de Galais, La famille Plouffe and Grand-Papa. She performed with Olivier Guimond in the popular sitcom .

Garneau was nominated for a Genie Award for her role in the film Maria Chapdelaine. She also gave notable performances in Taureau, Night Zoo (Un zoo la nuit), Orders (Les Ordres), The Vultures (Les Vautours) and The Years of Dreams and Revolt (Les Années de rêves).

Her son  is an actor.

Her brother  is a journalist.

Garneau died in Montreal at the age of 80 from cancer.

References

External links 
 

1928 births
2008 deaths
Actresses from Montreal
École des beaux-arts de Montréal alumni